CSU Suceava, also known as Universitatea Suceava, is a men's handball club from Suceava, Romania, that plays in the Romanian Handball League.

Kits

History
 2002 - Year of establishment as CS Universitatea Suceava
 2006 - First year in first league
 2011 - Third place in first league
 2012 - Fifth place in first league

References

External links
 Official Website

Romanian handball clubs
Suceava
Handball clubs established in 2002
2002 establishments in Romania
Liga Națională (men's handball)